NGC 690 is an intermediate spiral galaxy located in the constellation Cetus about 236 million light-years from the Milky Way. It was discovered by the American astronomer Francis Leavenworth in 1885.

References

External links 
 

690
Intermediate spiral galaxies
Cetus (constellation)
006587